The enzyme ATP-dependent NAD(P)H-hydrate dehydratase catalyzes the chemical reactions

ATP + (6S)-6-β-hydroxy-1,4,5,6-tetrahydronicotinamide-adenine dinucleotide  ADP + phosphate + NADH
ATP + (6S)-6-β-hydroxy-1,4,5,6-tetrahydronicotinamide-adenine dinucleotide phosphate  ADP + phosphate + NADPH

This enzyme belongs to the family of lyases, specifically the hydro-lyases, which cleave carbon-oxygen bonds.  The systematic name of this enzyme class is (6S)-6-β-hydroxy-1,4,5,6-tetrahydronicotinamide-adenine-dinucleotide hydro-lyase (ATP-hydrolysing; NADH-forming). Other names in common use include reduced nicotinamide adenine dinucleotide hydrate dehydratase, ATP-dependent H4NAD(P)+OH dehydratase, (6S)-β-6-hydroxy-1,4,5,6-tetrahydronicotinamide-adenine-, and dinucleotide hydro-lyase (ATP-hydrolysing).

References

 
 
 

EC 4.2.1
NADH-dependent enzymes
Enzymes of unknown structure